Temple US Records is a record label founded in the late 1970s by Robin Morton. Morton, a former member of The Boys of the Lough, had already founded Temple in Temple, Midlothian; Temple US is based in Arlington, Massachusetts.

Morton worked as a producer for Topic Records. This label was not interested in recording the clarsach player Alison Kinnaird, as they did not think the record would sell. He formed Temple Records to release her first LP, The Harp Key (1978), which became a best selling traditional music record. Morton later married Kinnaird.

One of the earliest signings was The Battlefield Band, who rapidly rose to international fame. Morton became their manager in 1980. All their albums are on the Temple label. The success of the Battlefield Band in America prompted Morton to set up Temple US Records in the mid-1980s. As well as recordings by current folk artists, the label has released historic recordings by James Scott Skinner.

See also
 List of record labels

American record labels